Newington is a suburb south west of Ballarat, Victoria, Australia.

Newington is bordered by Gillies Street to the west, Sturt Street to the north, Pleasant Street to the east and Winter Street to the south.

The Newington Estate Gold Mining Company, a deep lead mining company was established in Ballarat West in 1865. A post office opened in 1865 on the corner of Eyre street, nearby to H.Thomas butcher's shop and cottages. The first residential subdivisions occurred in 1867 with 50 lots released.

Newington is notable for Victoria Park, Ballarat's largest open parkland which features numerous sporting grounds connected by grand avenues of conifers and oaks planted in the 1920s as well as some ornamental wetlands and lakes.  

With the exception of the park and schools, the suburb consists almost solely of Single-family detached homes in grid plan street layout.  Many of the homes are either Victorian or interwar styles.

References

External links

Suburbs of Ballarat